"Buzzstyle" is a song by Hitomi Yaida, released as her fifth Japanese single. It is also the third single taken from the album Candlize.

It was used as the drama Kangei! Danjiki Goikkōsama's theme song.

It reached number 3 in the charts on October 13, 2001.

The associated PV was filmed in and around the Big-Top of Gerry Cottle's circus (see List of famous circuses and circus owners) and featured many of the acts.

The track was also re-written in English and released in 2001 as "Buzzstyle (Find My Way)" by the Irish group Bellefire.

Track listing

Notes

External links
Buzzstyle PV

2001 singles
Hitomi Yaida songs
Japanese television drama theme songs
2001 songs
Songs written by Hitomi Yaida